Gaumukhi is a Rural municipality located within the Pyuthan District of the Lumbini Province of Nepal.
The rural municipality spans  of area, with a total population of 25,421 according to a 2011 Nepal census.

On March 10, 2017, the Government of Nepal restructured the local level bodies into 753 new local level structures.
The previous Arkha Rajwara, Puja, Khung, portion of Libang and Narikot VDCs were merged to form Gaumukhi Rural Municipality.
Gaumukhi is divided into 7 wards, with Puja declared the administrative center of the rural municipality.

References

External links
official website of the rural municipality

Rural municipalities in Pyuthan District
Rural municipalities of Nepal established in 2017